Force Protection Europe (FPE) was the European subsidiary of Force Protection Inc, which was acquired by General Dynamics in 2011. The UK-based company developed the Foxhound, a light-weight mine-protected military vehicle, which was developed to replace the Snatch Land Rover. FPE won a £180 million contract from the British Ministry of Defence in 2010 to supply 200 Foxhound vehicles. Following the acquisition by General Dynamics in December 2011, the Foxhound is marketed as part of General Dynamics Land Systems vehicle portfolio.

References

External links
 

Companies based in Leamington Spa
Vehicle manufacturing companies established in 2008
Defunct motor vehicle manufacturers of the United Kingdom
Military vehicle manufacturers
2008 establishments in England
Vehicle manufacturing companies disestablished in 2011
2011 disestablishments in England
2011 mergers and acquisitions